Willy Nicolaj Holm-Sørensen (3 March 1904 – 9 July 1981) was a Danish rower. He competed at the 1928 Summer Olympics in Amsterdam with the men's eight where they were eliminated in round two.

References

1904 births
1981 deaths
 
Danish male rowers
Olympic rowers of Denmark
Rowers at the 1928 Summer Olympics
Sportspeople from Frederiksberg
European Rowing Championships medalists